A security appliance is any form of server appliance that is designed to protect computer networks from unwanted traffic.

Types of Security Appliances
 Active devices block unwanted traffic. Examples of such devices are firewalls, anti virus scanning devices, and content filtering devices.
 Passive devices detect and report on unwanted traffic, such as intrusion detection appliances.
 Preventative devices scan networks and identify potential security problems (such as penetration testing and vulnerability assessment appliances).
 Unified Threat Management (UTM) appliances combine features together into one system, such as some firewalls, content filtering, web caching etc.

References

Server appliance